Dan Pitcher (born January 13, 1987) is an American football coach who is the quarterbacks coach for the Cincinnati Bengals of the National Football League (NFL).

College career 
Pitcher was a quarterback at Colgate University in Hamilton, New York. He spent three years with the Raiders, sitting out one due to injury and redshirting another, he transferred to his hometown college SUNY Cortland, starting from 2009 to 2011. His senior season, he was a finalist for the Gagliardi Trophy, the Division III equivalent of the Heisman Trophy.

Career  
After his playing career at SUNY Cortland ended, he joined the Red Dragons coaching staff as their wide receivers coach in 2012. He spent one season at SUNY Cortland before moving on to the Indianapolis Colts as a scouting assistant. He was promoted by the Colts in 2014 to a pro scout.

Cincinnati Bengals 
Pitcher was hired by the Bengals in 2016 as an offensive assistant, working with the wide receivers. He was shifted to working with the quarterbacks in 2018 and was promoted by newly hired head coach Zac Taylor to assistant quarterbacks coach, as well as the team's game management specialist.

Following the departure of Alex Van Pelt, Pitcher was promoted to quarterbacks coach for the 2020 season.

References

External links  
Cincinnati Bengals profile

1987 births
Living people
People from Cortland, New York
Players of American football from New York (state)
Coaches of American football from New York (state)
American football quarterbacks
Colgate Raiders football players
Cortland Red Dragons football players
State University of New York at Cortland alumni
Cortland Red Dragons football coaches
Indianapolis Colts scouts
Cincinnati Bengals coaches